Carl Georg Christian Schumacher (14 May 1797, Bad Doberan – 22 June 1869, Schwerin) was a German painter.

References

External links 

 

1797 births
1869 deaths
German painters
German male painters
Nazarene painters